Hodgepodge Lodge (sometimes spelled Hodge-Podge Lodge) was a half-hour children's television series produced by the Maryland Center for Public Broadcasting and shown on a number of PBS stations from 1970 to 1977, hosted by "Miss" Jean Worthley. It featured the quiet Miss Jean introducing elementary school children to wild animals and other nature topics (for example, trees) in a calm setting around the namesake lodge.

Hodgepodge Lodge was aired on PBS stations on the East Coast and syndicated in the early and mid-1970s. The host introduced the wonders of nature to national audiences, which included inner-city children, many of whom had never seen a garden or an animal in a setting other than a zoo. Miss Jean did everything from opening a pine cone and exploring its depths (which might have led to the discovery of a beetle or worm) to examining the habitat of a hedgehog or a red fox.

Unfortunately, most episodes of Hodgepodge Lodge have been lost because the master tapes were erased to save money by allowing the tapes to be reused. Of the over 760 original episodes, only about 30 remain. Maryland Public Broadcasting offers some of the surviving episodes on DVD, and episodes can also be found on the American Archive of Public Broadcasting web site.

References

External links
 
 Hodgepodge Lodge: Acorn Fun
 Hodgepodge Lodge: Things to Grow in Winter

PBS original programming
1970s American children's television series
1970 American television series debuts
1977 American television series endings